Darvill is a surname. Notable people with the surname include:

 Arthur Darvill (born 1982), British actor and musician
 Benjamin Darvill (born 1967), a.k.a. Son of Dave, Canadian musician and singer–songwriter
 Keith Darvill (born 1948), British politician
 Timothy Darvill, English archaeologist